The 1997–98 season was the 99th season of competitive league football in the history of English football club Wolverhampton Wanderers. They played the season in the second tier of the English football system, the Football League First Division.

The team finished in ninth position in the league, failing to mount a serious promotion challenge after having finished third in the previous campaign. They did, however, reach the semi-finals of the FA Cup for the first time in nineteen years, where they lost to eventual double winners Arsenal.

Results

Football League First Division

A total of 24 teams competed in the Football League First Division in the 1997–98 season. Each team played every other team twice: once at their stadium, and once at the opposition's. Three points were awarded to teams for each win, one point per draw, and none for defeats. Teams finishing level on points were firstly divided by the number of goals scored rather than goal difference.

The provisional fixture list was released on 16 June 1997, but was subject to change in the event of matches being selected for television coverage or police concerns.

Final table

Source: Statto.com

Results summary

Results by round

FA Cup

League Cup

Players

|-
|align="left"|||align="left"| 
|0||0||0||0||0||0||0||0||0||0||
|-
|align="left"|||align="left"| 
|0||0||0||0||0||0||0||0||0||0||
|-
|align="left"|||align="left"| 
|11||0||2||0||0||0||style="background:#98FB98"|13||0||0||0||
|-
|align="left"|||align="left"| 
|35||0||5||0||5||0||45||0||0||0||
|-
|align="left"|||style="background:#faecc8" align="left"|  ‡
|||0||0||0||0||0||style="background:#98FB98"|||0||0||0||
|-
|align="left"|||align="left"|  (c)
|40||1||7||1||0||0||47||2||0||0||
|-
|align="left"|||align="left"| 
|0||0||0||0||0||0||0||0||0||0||
|-
|align="left"|||align="left"|  ¤
|12||0||0||0||4||0||style="background:#98FB98"|16||0||2||0||
|-
|align="left"|||align="left"| 
|||3||5||0||0||0||style="background:#98FB98"|||3||9||0||
|-
|align="left"|||align="left"| 
|||0||4||1||1||0||style="background:#98FB98"|||1||1||0||
|-
|align="left"|||align="left"| 
|13||0||7||1||0||0||20||1||1||0||
|-
|align="left"|||align="left"|  †
|11||0||0||0||5||0||16||0||0||0||
|-
|align="left"|||align="left"| 
|||1||0||0||||0||style="background:#98FB98"|||1||1||0||
|-
|align="left"|||align="left"| 
|20||0||||0||2||0||||0||3||0||
|-
|align="left"|||style="background:#faecc8" align="left"|  ‡
|||0||0||0||0||0||style="background:#98FB98"|||0||0||0||
|-
|align="left"|||align="left"| 
|||2||||0||5||0||||2||3||0||
|-
|align="left"|||align="left"| 
|||0||0||0||0||0||||0||0||0||
|-
|align="left"|||align="left"| 
|||0||||0||0||0||||0||0||0||
|-
|align="left"|||align="left"|  †
|||0||0||0||0||0||style="background:#98FB98"|||0||0||0||
|-
|align="left"|||align="left"|  †
|||0||0||0||0||0||||0||1||0||
|-
|align="left"|||align="left"| 
|||0||2||1||5||1||||2||8||0||
|-
|align="left"|||align="left"| 
|||2||3||0||3||1||||3||4||0||
|-
|align="left"|||align="left"| 
|||0||0||0||0||0||||0||1||0||
|-
|align="left"|||align="left"| 
|||2||3||0||0||0||||2||3||1||
|-
|align="left"|||align="left"| 
|||3||7||1||4||0||||4||7||0||
|-
|align="left"|||align="left"| 
|||0||6||0||2||0||style="background:#98FB98"|||0||4||2||
|-
|align="left"|||style="background:#faecc8" align="left"|  ‡
|||0||0||0||||1||style="background:#98FB98"|||1||1||0||
|-
|align="left"|||align="left"| 
|||4||||0||0||0||style="background:#98FB98"|||4||0||1||
|-
|align="left"|||align="left"| 
|||0||||0||0||0||style="background:#98FB98"|||0||0||0||
|-
|align="left"|||align="left"|  †
|||0||0||0||0||0||||0||0||0||
|-
|align="left"|FW||align="left"| 
|||7||||0||5||2||||9||2||1||
|-
|align="left"|FW||align="left"| 
|||0||1||0||0||0||style="background:#98FB98"|||0||0||0||
|-
|align="left"|FW||align="left"|  ¤
|||0||0||0||0||0||||0||0||0||
|-
|align="left"|FW||align="left"|  ¤
|||0||0||0||||0||||0||0||0||
|-
|align="left"|FW||align="left"| 
|||10||||2||0||0||style="background:#98FB98"|||12||8||0||
|-
|align="left"|FW||align="left"| 
|||8||6||1||||1||||10||4||0||
|-
|align="left"|FW||align="left"| 
|0||0||0||0||0||0||0||0||0||0||
|-
|align="left"|FW||align="left"| 
|||11||||0||||0||style="background:#98FB98"|||11||2||0||
|-
|align="left"|FW||align="left"| 
|0||0||0||0||0||0||0||0||0||0||
|-
|align="left"|FW||align="left"| 
|||0||||4||||1||style="background:#98FB98"|||5||6||0||
|-
|align="left"|FW||align="left"|  ¤
|0||0||0||0||0||0||0||0||0||0||
|}

Transfers

In

Out

Loans in

Loans out

Kit
The season retained the home kit of the previous year: a "wolf head" design created using their traditional gold and black colours. A new away kit comprising a white away shirt with a dark green collar and dark green shorts was introduced. Both were manufactured by Puma and sponsored by Goodyear.

References

1997–98
Wolverhampton Wanderers